The Devil's Holiday is a 1930 American Pre-Code film starring Nancy Carroll, Phillips Holmes, ZaSu Pitts, James Kirkwood, Sr., Hobart Bosworth, and Ned Sparks, and released by Paramount Pictures.

The movie was adapted by Edmund Goulding from his story, directed by Goulding, and released by Paramount Pictures. The film was nominated for Academy Award for Best Actress (Nancy Carroll).

Plot
A golddigger marries a young man for his money, but finds that she really loves him and wants to keep him despite his family's disapproval.

Cast
Nancy Carroll - Hallie Hobart
Phillips Holmes - David Stone
James Kirkwood - Mark Stone
Hobart Bosworth - Ezra Stone
Ned Sparks - Charlie Thorne
Morgan Farley - Monkey McConnell
Jed Prouty - Kent Carr
Paul Lukas - Dr. Reynolds
ZaSu Pitts - Ethel
Morton Downey - Freddie, the tenor
Guy Oliver - Hammond
Wade Boteler - House Detective
Laura La Varnie - Madame Bernstein (*billed Laura Le Vernie)

References

External links
The Devil's Holiday at IMDB

1930 films
American black-and-white films
1930s English-language films
Films directed by Edmund Goulding
1930 romantic drama films
American romantic drama films
American multilingual films
1930 multilingual films
Paramount Pictures films
1930s American films